La Cavalerie is a commune in the Aveyron department in southern France. During the 1970s it became the focal point of peasant resistance to the proposed extension of the Larzac military training base, just to the north.

Population

See also
Communes of the Aveyron department

References

Communes of Aveyron
Aveyron communes articles needing translation from French Wikipedia